Khooni Katar also called Golden Dagger is a 1931 Indian cinema's action adventure silent film directed by A. R. Kardar. 
The film was also called Sunheri Khanjar and the fifth film to be produced by Kardar for his United Pictures Corporation.  The film is famous for the debut of the actor-producer-director Nazir.

The cast included Gul Hamid, Gulzar, M. Ismail, Hiralal, Ghulam Qadir and M. Zahoor.

Cast
 Gul Hamid
 Gulzar
 M. Ismail
 Hiralal
 Ghulam Qadir
 M. Zahoor
 Ahmed Din

References

External links

1931 films
Silent action adventure films
Lollywood
Indian silent films
Indian black-and-white films
Films directed by A. R. Kardar
Indian action adventure films
1930s action adventure films